William H. Hall High School, also known as Hall High, is a four-year public high school located in West Hartford, in the U.S. state of Connecticut. Opened in 1924, it was named after William Henry Hall, who was a teacher, principal, and superintendent of schools in West Hartford. The school colors are blue and white, and the school’s mascot is the Titans, formerly the Warriors, after the Board Of Education vote to change it on February 1, 2022. It is one of two public high schools in the West Hartford Public Schools, the other being Conard High School.

Demographics 
The 2019–2020 demographic profile is as follows: White 61%, Hispanic 15%, Asian American 12%, Black 7%, two or more races 5%, American Indian/Alaskan Native 0.1%, and Hawaiian Native/Pacific Islander 0.2%.

Athletics and clubs
Hall high school is part of the CCC, the Central Connecticut Conference competing in the west division. The Board of Education added varsity sports for girls in January 1972.

Soccer

In soccer, Hall won the state championship in 1980 and 2019. In 2018, they were state championship runner-ups. In 2020, the boys soccer team finished nationally ranked on several polls, including being ranked 3rd in the country, and as the highest ranked public school on the TopDrawerSoccer Fall Fab 50 rankings.

Ice hockey
Hall's boys' ice hockey team captured the CIAC Division II ice hockey state championship in 1993.

Cross country
Hall's Boys' Cross country team has won the Central Connecticut Conference Championships five of the last six years dating back to 2012.
Hall won the Class LL State Championship in cross country for the first time in 2021, and then repeated in 2022. In 2022, Hall also won the CT State Open Championship and the New England Championship in cross country.

Indoor track
Hall's boys indoor track team won both Class LL Championships and the CT State Open Championships in 2019, 2021, and 2022.

Chess
In 2011, Hall's chess team won the state championship.

Pops 'n Jazz
Hall High School has a renowned jazz program, which stage an annual production called Pops 'n Jazz, regularly selling over 3,000 tickets every year. They have also won the Essentially Ellington High School Jazz Band Competition and Festival twice, in 1998 and 2000. The band has performed for the president at the White House, appeared in Ken Burns' documentary film "Jazz."

Academic accomplishments
Blue Ribbon School in 1984–85.
Ranked as the 11th best school in the state of Connecticut by U.S. News & World Report in 2018.

Notable alumni

 Natalie Anderson, Survivor: San Juan del Sur winner
David Alan Basche, actor
Chris Carrabba, musician and lead singer of the band Dashboard Confessional attended freshman year
Dave Chameides, Emmy Award winning Director and Cameraman
Jacob Fox, mathematician
Joel Frahm, jazz tenor saxophonist
Harvey Harris, American painter and art professor
Jonathan Harris, former Connecticut state senator and former mayor of West Hartford
Peter Hotez, public health researcher and vaccine developer 
Charlie Kaufman, screenwriter, director
Matthew Yang King, actor, producer, director, and writer
Marc Lasry (Class of 1977), billionaire co-founder/CEO of Avenue Capital Group, and co-owner of the NBA's Milwaukee Bucks
Frank Luntz,  political and communications consultant, pollster, and pundit
Jimmy Macbride, jazz drummer
Brad Mehldau, Grammy award winning jazz pianist
Jacob Neusner, scholar of Judaism
Noah Preminger, jazz saxophonist
Jessica Rosenworcel, Commissioner of the Federal Communications Commission
Michael Schur, Emmy Award winning actor, television producer, and writer.
Roger Sperry, neuropsychologist and Nobel Prize laureate
David H. Steinberg, film and television writer and producer
Allyson Swaby, professional soccer player and captain of Jamaican national team
Chantelle Swaby, professional soccer player
Patrick Zimmerli, composer

References

External links

West Hartford Public Schools official site

Buildings and structures in West Hartford, Connecticut
Schools in Hartford County, Connecticut
Public high schools in Connecticut
1924 establishments in Connecticut